Shatheh  is a Syrian village located in Suran Nahiyah in Hama District, Hama.  According to the Syria Central Bureau of Statistics (CBS), Shatheh had a population of 103 in the 2004 census.

References 

Populated places in Hama District